Yehud was a province of the Neo-Babylonian Empire established in the former territories of the Kingdom of Judah, which was destroyed by the Babylonians in the aftermath of the Judahite revolts and the siege of Jerusalem in 587/6 BCE. It first existed as a Jewish administrative division under Gedaliah ben Aḥikam, who was later assassinated by a fellow Jew. The Fast of Gedaliah, a minor fast day in Judaism, was established in memory of this event, and is lamented by observant Jews even to this day.

After the collapse of the Neo-Babylonian Empire in 539 BCE, the province was absorbed into the Persian Achaemenid Empire as a self-governing Jewish region called Yehud Medinata.

Background

In the late 7th century BCE Judah became a vassal kingdom of the Neo-Babylonian Empire; however, there were rival factions at the court in Jerusalem, some supporting loyalty to Babylon, others urging rebellion. In the early years of the 6th century, despite the strong remonstrances of the prophet Jeremiah and others, king Zedekiah revolted against Nebuchadrezzar and entered into an alliance with pharaoh Hophra of Egypt. The revolt failed, and in 597 BCE many Judahites, including the prophet Ezekiel, were exiled to Babylon. A few years later Judah revolted yet again. In 589 Nebuchadnezzar again besieged Jerusalem, and many Jews fled to Moab, Ammon, Edom and other countries to seek refuge. The city fell after an eighteen-month siege and Nebuchadnezzar again pillaged and destroyed Jerusalem and burned the Temple. Thus, by 586 BCE much of Judah was devastated, the royal family, the priesthood, and the scribes—the country's elite—were in exile in Babylon, and much of the population still in neighbouring countries. The former kingdom suffered a steep decline of both economy and population.

Even though Jerusalem and its immediate surroundings were destroyed, along with settlements in the western part of the kingdom, the region of Benjamin, north of Jerusalem, survived the onslaught and became the center of the Babylonian province of Yehud, with Mizpah as its capital.

History

Babylonian era (587–539 BCE)

The former kingdom of Judah then became a Babylonian province. According to Miller and Hayes, the province included the towns of Bethel in the north, Mizpah, Jericho in the east, Jerusalem, Beth-Zur in the west and En-Gedi in the south. Jerusalem being in ruins, Mizpah was the administrative center of the province. Gedaliah, a native Judahite but not of the royal Davidic dynasty, was appointed governor (or possibly ruling as a puppet king). On hearing of the appointment, the Jews that had taken refuge in surrounding countries returned to Judah.

However, Gedaliah was assassinated by Ishmael ben Nethaniah, a member of the former royal house, and the Babylonian garrison killed, triggering a mass movement of refugees to Egypt. A minor fast day of the Fast of Gedaliah commemorates this event. In Egypt, the refugees settled in Migdol, Tahpanhes, Noph, and Pathros, and Jeremiah went with them as moral guardian.

Although the dates are not clear from the Bible, this probably happened about 582/1 BCE,  some four to five years and three months after the destruction of Jerusalem and the First Temple in 586 BCE.

Transfer to Persian rule

Demographics

The numbers deported to Babylon or who made their way to Egypt, and the remnant that remained in Yehud province and in surrounding countries, is subject to academic debate. The Book of Jeremiah reports that a total of 4,600 were exiled to Babylon. To these numbers must be added those deported by Nebuchadnezzar in 597 BCE following the first siege to Jerusalem, when he deported the king of Judah, Jeconiah, and his court and other prominent citizens and craftsmen, along with a sizable portion of the Jewish population of Judah, numbering about 10,000. The Book of Kings also suggests that it was eight thousand. Israel Finkelstein, a prominent archaeologist, suggests that the 4,600 represented the heads of households and 8,000 was the total, whilst 10,000 is a rounding upwards of the second number. Jeremiah also hints that an equivalent number may have fled to Egypt. Given these figures, Finkelstein suggests that 3/4 of the population of Judah had remained.

In his examination of the archaeological evidence for the demography of Yehud during the 6th century BCE, archaeologist Avraham Faust states that between the deportations and executions caused by the Babylonians, plus the famines and epidemics that occurred during the war, the population of Judah was reduced to barely a 10% of what it had been in the time before the Exile.

References

Autonomous administrative divisions
Ancient Israel and Judah
States and territories established in the 6th century BC
586 BC
Political entities in the Land of Israel
Jewish Babylonian history